Kintner is a surname. Notable people with the surname include:

Earl W. Kintner (1912–1991), Chairman of the Federal Trade Commission
Jill Kintner (born 1981), professional American "Mid School" Bicycle Motocross (BMX) and professional mountain cross racer
Robert E. Kintner (1909–1980), American journalist and television executive, president of both NBC and ABC
William Kintner (1915–1997), U.S. Ambassador to Thailand (1973–1975) and president of the Foreign Policy Research Institute (1975–1982)

See also
Kintner House Hotel, located within the Corydon Historic District in Corydon, Indiana, is a historic bed & breakfast
Kintner-McGrain House, on the National Register of Historic Places, located north of downtown Corydon, Indiana
Kintner–Withers House, on the National Register of Historic Places, south of Laconia, Indiana, along the Ohio River